Sclerocrinidae is a family of echinoderms belonging to the order Millericrinida.

Genera:
 Ascidicrinus Hess, Salamon & Gorzelak, 2011 
 Cyrtocrinus Jaekel, 1892 
 Hemicrinus d'Orbigny, 1850 
 Neogymnocrinus Hess, 2006 
 Pilocrinus Jaekel, 1907 
 Proholopus Jaekel, 1908 
 Sclerocrinus Jaekel, 1892 
 Torynocrinus Seeley, 1866

References

Cyrtocrinida
Echinoderm families